The United Farmers of British Columbia was a union of farmers established in 1917. Unlike some of their sibling United Farmers organizations in other provinces, the United Farmers of British Columbia were never directly incorporated as a full political party in their own right, although two candidates stood under the United Farmers banner in the 1920 provincial election, and the United Farmers subsequently participated in the creation of the Provincial Party of British Columbia.

References 

Agrarian parties in Canada
Defunct agrarian political parties
Defunct political parties in Canada
Provincial political parties in British Columbia
Social democratic parties in Canada
Trade unions established in 1917
1917 establishments in British Columbia
Trade unions in British Columbia
United Farmers
1930s disestablishments in British Columbia